Skweee is a musical style, with origin in Sweden and Finland. Skweee combines simple synth/chiptune leads and basslines with funk, R&B or soul-like rhythms, overall rendering a stripped-down funky sound. The tracks are predominantly instrumental, though there are exceptions.

Origins
The name "skweee" was coined by Daniel Savio, one of the originators of the emerging sound. The name refers to the use of analog synthesizers in the production process, where the aim is to "squeeze out" the most interesting sounds possible.
 
Producers can vary from high-profile to new talent from the Scandinavian electronica environment.

Recognition
Skweeelicious, a blog dedicated to skweee, and community sites such as Myspace and Nation of Skweee have played a major role in the distribution of skweee music and public exposure of the genre.

The major outlets of skweee music are the Swedish record label Flogsta Danshall and Finnish record label Harmönia. Norwegian Dødpop, Canadian Ancient Robot, US Losonofono, US Titched, US Poisonous Gases, Spanish Lo Fi Funk, Finnish Mässy, and French Mazout have since been added to this family. The preferred media format of skweee enthusiasts is the 7" vinyl record. Early releases were exclusively released in this format. More recently, however, a series of 12" vinyl records, digital releases and CD compilations have been released through these outlets as well.

The increasing notability of the skweee genre has resulted in releases such as the Eero Johannes album on Planet Mu and the Skweee Tooth compilation on Ramp Recordings.

Skweee and dubstep
During late 2008 and early 2009, skweee started to influence the sound of dubstep. A thread started on the dubstepforum made the scene aware of skweee. Producers such as Rusko, Gemmy, Joker, Zomby, Rustie, among others, have given their take on the sound, resulting in several releases on the boundary between skweee and dubstep.

References

External links
 Interview with skweee pioneer Pavan
 John McDonnell's (The Guardian UK) blog article about skweee
 Article in Spin magazine (April 2009) as a PDF file
 Article in Clash magazine
 Article in The Wire
 Podcast featuring live recording of Harmönia vs Flogsta battle at the Norberg Festival 2009 and an interview with most of the main artists of these labels

2000s in music
21st-century music genres
Chiptune
Funk genres
Electro (music)
Electronic dance music genres
Finnish music
Swedish styles of music